The Korean Series Most Valuable Player (MVP) Award is given to the player deemed to have the most impact on his team's performance in the Korean Series, which is the final round of the KBO League postseason. The award was first presented in 1982.

List

See also
Japan Series Most Valuable Player Award
World Series Most Valuable Player Award

References

Awards established in 1950
KBO League trophies and awards
Baseball most valuable player awards
Most valuable player awards
1982 establishments in South Korea